Havana is an Edwardian musical comedy in three acts, with a book by George Grossmith, Jr. and Graham Hill, music by Leslie Stuart, lyrics by Adrian Ross and additional lyrics by George Arthurs. It premiered on 25 April 1908 at the Gaiety Theatre, London, starring Evie Greene as Consuelo, W. H. Berry as Reginald Brown, Lawrence Grossmith as Don Adolfo and Mabel Russell as Pepita.  A young Gladys Cooper was in the chorus.

The production ran for 221 performances before touring the provinces.  It also soon played in Berlin, Germany.  An American production played at the Casino Theatre in New York after a Philadelphia tryout, with revisions by its star, James T. Powers.  This production was staged by Ned Wayburn and ran from 11 February 1909 to 25 September 1909 for a total of 236 performances.

Among the show's musical numbers are the songs Little Miquette, Cupid's Telephone, How Did the Bird Know That? and Pensacola. Musical selections from the show were recorded by the Victor Light Opera Company in 1909.

Roles and original cast
Jackson Villiers (of the Steam Yacht Jaunty June)  – Leonard Mackay
The Hon. Frank Charteris – Robert Hale
Bombito del Campo (Mayor of Havana) – Arthur Hatherton
Don Adolfo (his son) – Lawrence Grossmith
Antonio (Adolfo's  valet) – Barry Lupino
Diego de la Concha – Edward O'Neill
Nix (bo'sun of the Jaunty June) – Alfred Lester
Reginald Brown (the yacht's boy) – W. H. Berry
Anita (a cigar seller) – Jean Aylwin
Isabelita (Bombito's sister) – Gladys Homfreye
Tita (chief of the cigar store) – Olive May
Pepita – Mabel Russell
Lolita – Adelina Balfe
Zara – Jessie Broughton
Newspaper reporter – Gladys Cooper
Consuelo (Bombito's niece) – Evie Greene

Synopsis
According to The Manchester Guardian: "The plot is slight, and is concerned with Consuelo, the niece of the proprietor of a cigar factory and Mayor of Havana. She is betrothed to her cousin Adolfo, but loves an English yachtsman, Jackson Villiers. He is suspected of participation in the plots of the Red Liberados, so she publicly insults him; but he does not seem to mind much, and all ends well."

Musical numbers
Act I   –   Cigar Store of Bombito and Co. 
No. 1 – Chorus – 'Tis noon, the noon of tropic day
No. 2 – Bombito and chorus of girls – If I was a ruler despotical, presumably properly paid 
No. 3 – Anita – Once a sailor man I married, seven years ago today 
No. 4 – Tita, Lolita, Pepita, Bombito, Hilario and Alejandro – There's a yacht in the harbour today 
No. 5 – Consuelo and chorus – I'm a Cuban girl from the island pearl
No. 6 – Adolfo and girls – Six little girls went on a tour run by a daily print 
No. 7 – Jackson and girls – As I sit on my hammock, smoking and smoking
No. 8 – Reginald and Nix – When I play the buccaneer I'm a flier, never fear 
No. 9 – Finale Act I – The girl with the yellow roses
Act II   –   Patio of the Torre del Campo. 
Nos. 10 and 11 – Chorus and Zara – The sun is down and over the town, far above is the star that we love 
No. 12 – Consuelo and girls – Little Miquette, you mustn't forget
No. 13 – Reginald and chorus – When I was born, my birthmark was a pirate flag of black 
No. 14 – Anita and Reginald – If you go where duty calls, from a station at St. Paul's 
No. 15 – Anita, Pepita, Frank and Reginald – If you see a little bag lying down upon a flag 
No. 16 – Adolfo and chorus of girls – If you desire to see your little girlie 
No. 17 – Frank – When a fellow loves a girl in London Town 
No. 18 – Finale Act II – Welcome to the lovely bride
Act III   –   The Harbour, Havana. 
No. 19 – Chorus – The morning breaks upon the shore 
No. 20 – Anita and Nix – If you're the dear departed
No. 21 – Reginald – When I was once a naughty little nipper
No. 22 – Pepita and chorus – I know there's a little girl that you know 
No. 23 – Consuelo – I know a man who's waiting for me down there by the sea 
No. 24 – Ensemble – girls, will you take a walk for a while? 
No. 25 – Finale Act III – I'm a Cuban girl from the island of pearl

References

External links
Havana at the IBDB database
Photo of Evie Greene in Havana
Photo of Gladys Cooper in Havana
Havana on the National Library of Australia website
 Midi music from "Havana" 1908 musical

1908 musicals
Original musicals
British musicals